Harry Dudfield (12 May 1912 – 19 July 1987) was a New Zealand politician of the National Party.

Biography

Dudfield was born in Gisborne in 1912. He worked for A. and T. Burt until World War II, when he became a soldier and served in the Middle East, Italy and the Pacific. After the war, he worked for the Department of Health, first in Auckland and then in Tokomaru Bay. As a New Zealand Army Captain with Kayforce, he led an advance party to the Korean War, but was withdrawn to contest the  snap election for the  electorate.

He won the Gisborne electorate from Labour's Reginald Keeling in the 1951 election, but lost to Keeling in the next election in 1954.  He told Parliament in 1952 that he doubted Communist claims that United Nations forces were using germ warfare in Korea. In 1953, Dudfield was awarded the Queen Elizabeth II Coronation Medal.

After his time in Parliament, he worked as a health inspector in Rotorua and then in Tawa. In 1955, he married Mona Lindsay at the Presbyterian Church in St Albans, Christchurch. Dudfield died on 19 July 1987 in Tawa, and his wife died on 14 November 2010.

Notes

References

1912 births
1987 deaths
New Zealand National Party MPs
New Zealand military personnel of World War II
New Zealand military personnel of the Korean War
New Zealand Army officers
People from Gisborne, New Zealand
New Zealand MPs for North Island electorates
Members of the New Zealand House of Representatives
Unsuccessful candidates in the 1954 New Zealand general election
Unsuccessful candidates in the 1949 New Zealand general election